Shin Myat Hla (also known as Shin Mi-Myat or Me Myat Hla) was the chief queen consort of King Mohnyin Thado of Ava (now Burma) from 1426 to 1439. She was also a junior queen of King Minkhaung I of Ava for five months in 1409–10. She was the mother of kings Minye Kyawswa I and Narapati I of Ava. She was also an eight-times great-grandmother of King Alaungpaya of the Konbaung dynasty.

Brief
Shin Myat Hla was descended from Pinya and Pagan royal lines. Her father Thihapate II was a grandson of King Thihathu of Ava, and her mother was a great-great-granddaughter of King Kyawswa of Pagan. She was born in early 1388. She grew up in Taungdwin which her father had ruled since at least 1364. She had at least one full younger brother, Thiri Zeya Thura.

Her cloistered upbringing changed drastically in 1409. She was married off to King Minkhaung I of Ava. (She was following in the footsteps of her niece Shin Bo-Me, who became a queen of Minkhaung in 1407.) But five months into the marriage, the king gave her to Thado, then a commander in his army, as a reward for the commander's performance in then ongoing war with Pegu. Furthermore, the couple was sent off to Mohnyin, a rebellion-prone Shan state (in present-day Kachin State), where her new husband was appointed sawbwa ("lord governor"). Over the next 16 years, her husband came to be known as "Mohnyin Thado". The couple had four children (two sons and two daughters): Minye Kyawswa, Narapati, Shin Hla Myat, and Saw Hla Htut.

Myat Hla became queen of Ava again—this time as the chief queen, succeeding her niece Bo-Me—in 1426 when Mohnyin Thado seized the Ava throne. She remained the chief queen for the entire duration of Mohnyin's reign (1426–39).

Her two sons became kings of Ava. Her eldest child Minye Kyawswa reigned from 1439 to 1442 while her second child Narapati reigned from 1442 to 1468. In all, her descendants ruled Ava until 1527. King Alaungpaya, the founder of the Konbaung dynasty, was an 11th generation descendant of the queen.

Ancestry
The following is her ancestry as given in the Hmannan Yazawin chronicle.

Notes

References

Bibliography
 
 
 
 

Chief queens consort of Ava
1388 births
14th-century Burmese women
15th-century Burmese women